In mathematics, a jacket matrix is a square symmetric matrix   of order  n  if its entries are non-zero and real, complex, or from a finite field, and  

where In is the identity matrix, and 

where T denotes the transpose of the matrix.

In other words, the inverse of a jacket matrix is determined its element-wise or block-wise inverse.  The definition above may also be expressed as:

The jacket matrix is a generalization of the Hadamard matrix; it is a diagonal block-wise inverse matrix.

Motivation

As shown in the table, i.e. in the series, for example with n=2, forward: ,  inverse : , then, .  That is, there exists an element-wise inverse.

Example 1. 

:

or more general
:

Example 2. 
For m x m matrices,  
 

denotes an mn x mn block diagonal Jacket matrix.

Example 3. 
Euler's formula:
Therefore,
.

Also,

,.

Finally,

A·B = B·A = I

Example 4. 

 Consider   be 2x2 block matrices of order  
.

Example 5. 
,
⇒
where U, C, A, G denotes the amount of the DNA nucleobases and the matrix  is the block circulant Jacket matrix which leads to the principle of the Antagonism with Nirenberg Genetic Code matrix.

References 

[1] Moon Ho Lee, "The Center Weighted Hadamard Transform", IEEE Transactions on Circuits Syst. Vol. 36, No. 9, PP. 1247–1249, Sept. 1989.

[2] Kathy Horadam, Hadamard Matrices and Their Applications, Princeton University Press, UK, Chapter 4.5.1: The jacket matrix construction, PP. 85–91, 2007.

[3] Moon Ho Lee, Jacket Matrices: Constructions and Its Applications for Fast Cooperative Wireless Signal Processing, LAP LAMBERT Publishing, Germany, Nov. 2012.

[4] Moon Ho Lee, et. al., "MIMO Communication Method and System using the Block Circulant Jacket Matrix," US patent, no. US 009356671B1, May, 2016.

[5] S. K. Lee and M. H. Lee, “The COVID-19 DNA-RNA Genetic Code Analysis Using Information Theory of Double Stochastic Matrix,” IntechOpen, Book Chapter, April 17th, 2022. [Available in Online: https://www.intechopen.com/chapters/81329].

External links
 Technical report: Linear-fractional Function, Elliptic Curves, and Parameterized Jacket Matrices
 Jacket Matrix and Its Fast Algorithms for Cooperative Wireless Signal Processing
 Jacket Matrices: Constructions and Its Applications for Fast Cooperative Wireless Signal Processing
Matrices